No Trampolim da Vida is a 1946 Brazilian drama film directed by Franz Eichhorn for Filmes Artísticos Nacionais. The film starred Jararaca e Ratinho, Cléa Barros and Helmuth Schneider.
Ballerina Luz del Fuego also had a minor role in the film.

References

External links

1946 films
Brazilian drama films
1946 drama films
Brazilian black-and-white films